Short Line Subdivision refers to the following CSX Transportation lines:

Short Line Subdivision (Ohio), formerly the Cleveland Short Line Railway
Short Line Subdivision (West Virginia), formerly the West Virginia Short Line Railroad

See also
 Shore Line Subdivision